Katerina Theophanous is an Australian politician. She is a Labor Party member of the Victorian Legislative Assembly since November 2018, representing the seat of Northcote. Theophanous sits on the Victorian Legislative Assembly's Economy and Infrastructure Committee. She is a member of the Community and Public Sector Union (CPSU).

She is the daughter of former Victorian Labor MLC Theo Theophanous.

Education 
Theophanous completed a Bachelor of Arts in Media and Communications at the University of Melbourne in 2008. She later completed a Bachelor of Arts Honours from the University of Melbourne in 2011, majoring in philosophy.

Personal life 
Theophanous is married and has two children.

References

Living people
Australian Labor Party members of the Parliament of Victoria
Members of the Victorian Legislative Assembly
Women members of the Victorian Legislative Assembly
21st-century Australian politicians
Labor Right politicians
21st-century Australian women politicians
Australian people of Greek Cypriot descent
University of Melbourne alumni politicians
1987 births